Nityānanda (born circa 1474), also called Nitai, was a primary religious figure within the Gaudiya Vaishnava tradition of Bengal. Nitai was Chaitanya Mahaprabhu's friend and disciple. They are often mentioned together as Gaura-Nitai (Gaura, "golden one", referring to Chaitanya, Nitai being a shortened form of Nityānanda Rama) or Nimai-Nitai (Nimai being another name of Chaitanya). Followers often refer to Nityānanda as "Sri Nityananda", "Prabhu Nityananda" or "Nityananda Rama".

According to Gaudiya-Vaishnava tradition, Nityānanda is an incarnation of Balarama, with Chaitanya being his eternal brother and friend, Krishna. He is considered the "most merciful" incarnation of the Supreme Personality of Godhead (a term popularised by A.C. Bhaktivedanta Swami).

Bhaktisiddhanta Sarasvati writes: "Nityananda is the Primary Manifestive Constituent of the Divinity. Nityananda alone possesses the distinctive function of the guru. In Nityananda, the function is embodied. Nityananda is the Primary Manifestive Constituent of the Divinity. Nityananda alone possesses the distinctive function of the guru. In Nityananda, the function is embodied. Nityananda is the servant-God."

Life

Nityānanda was born to a religious Bengali Brahmin, known as Pandit Hadai, and his wife, Padmavati, in Ekachakra around the year 1474. His devotion and great talent for singing Vaishnava hymns (bhajan) were apparent from a very early age. In his youth, he generally played the part of Lakshman, Rama's younger brother, in dramatic re-enactments of Lord Rama's pastimes, along with the other boys of Ekachakra.

At the age of thirteen, Nitai left home with a travelling renunciate (sannyasi) known as Lakshmipati Tirtha. Nityānanda's father, Hadai Pandit, offered Lakshmipati anything he wished as a gift, who replied that he was in need of someone to assist him in his travels to the holy places, and that Nityānanda would be perfect for the job. As he had given his word, Hadai agreed, and Nitai joined him in his travels. Apart from Lakshmipati, who at some point initiated him, Nityānanda was also associated with Lakshmipati Tirtha's other disciples: Madhavendra Puri, Advaita Acharya, and Ishvara Puri, the spiritual master of Chaitanya Mahaprabhu.

He died sometime between the years 1540 and 1544.

Marriage and descendants

Nitai married two daughters of Suryadasa Sarakhela: Vasudha and Jahnava Devi with the help of Uddharan Dutta Thakura of Saptogram. After marriage, he settled in Khardaha, 24 Parganas, West Bengal. He had a son, Virachandra Goswami or Virabhadra who was later initiated to Vaishnava rites by his co-mother Mata Jahnava Devi, and a daughter, Ganga, by his first wife, Vasudha.

Legacy

Chaitanya and Nityānanda's deeds have deep religious and cultural implications in Bengal. They are credited with the revival of Hinduism in Eastern India, plagued mainly by the caste system, which they denounced. Much of Vaishnava literature, regarded as one of the finest literary heritages of medieval Bengal, came from them or their disciples.

See also 
Chaitanya Mahaprabhu
Gaudiya Vaishnavism
Pancha Tattva (Vaishnavism)
Gopalas

References

External links
  
 
 Learn more about the Life and pastimes of Lord Nitai. Checkout this widely appreciated enlightening book : Nitai Karuna Sindhu (Lord Nityananda – An Ocean of mercy)

1474 births
16th-century Hindu religious leaders
Bengali Hindus
Bengali Hindu saints
15th-century Bengalis
People from Birbhum district
Devotees of Krishna
Devotees of Jagannath
Kirtan performers
Scholars from West Bengal
Gaudiya religious leaders
Hindu revivalists
Indian Vaishnavites
Vaishnava saints
Year of death missing